27 Squadron may refer to:

No. 27 Squadron RAF, Royal Air Force
No. 27 Squadron RAAF, Royal Australian Air Force
No. 27 Squadron PAF, also known as the Zarrars, a unit of the Pakistan Air Force
27th Fighter Squadron, U.S. Air Force
27th Helicopter Squadron, Yugoslav Air Force